The 2006 ICF World Junior Canoe Slalom Championships were the 11th edition of the ICF World Junior Canoe Slalom Championships. The event took place in Solkan, Slovenia from 7 to 9 July 2006 under the auspices of the International Canoe Federation (ICF).

Medal summary

Men

Canoe

Kayak

Women

Kayak

Medal table

References

External links
International Canoe Federation

ICF World Junior Canoe Slalom Championships
ICF World Junior and U23 Canoe Slalom Championships